Pinxton is a village and civil parish in Derbyshire on the western boundary of Nottinghamshire, England, just south of the Pinxton Interchange at Junction 28 of the M1 motorway where the A38 road meets the M1. Pinxton is part of the Bolsover District and at the 2011 Census had a population of 5,699.
"Pinxton CCTV level crossing", located on the up and down Kirkby lines, is a major tourist attraction for train enthusiasts who come from all over the country to take photographs of some of the unique locomotives that pass over the crossing.

History

Etymology
In Anglo-Saxon times, Pinxton was a small agricultural community, thought to have been recorded in the Domesday Book of 1086 as "Esnotrewic." It is also thought that it was known as "Snodeswic," given by Wulfric Spott to Burton Abbey. In Norman times, along with a number of other manors, it was under the control of William Peveril, for whom it was held by Drogo fitz Pons. It is thought that he renamed the manor "Ponceston" and it gradually changed to Penekeston and then to Pinxton.

Coal
Since 1800 BC, coal had been extracted in the area. In 1794 the Cromford Canal encouraged this trade. By the beginning of the next century there were a number of deep coal mines. Trade increased with the growth of the industrial revolution. There were also four lime kilns and a china works producing quality ware. Pinxton's prosperity increased further as the terminus, in 1819, of the Mansfield and Pinxton Railway opened.

From the profits of his colliery at Pinxton, D'Ewes Coke (1747-1811) of Brookhill Hall, a clergyman colliery master, founded a local school and an educational charity.

The collieries and coking ovens have been replaced by an industrial estate, and the old colliery village has all but disappeared.

John King
John King is the inventor of a mining safety device, a detaching hook, which successfully completed trials in 1873 at Pinxton No.1 colliery. The detaching hook prevents a cage raising miners from a shaft from being raised up and over the headstock pulley when raised from a mine shaft. A mining museum in Pinxton honoring John King and commemorating the invention of the detaching hook was closed in 2014 and its contents distributed to other museums and heritage centres. 
In Pinxton today, there remains the John King mining Wheel, It was used in the days when mining was available. Now the John King wheel is a historical model for the public to see and also the name of a school in Pinxton. The horse gin, or whim from Pinxton Green Colliery has been re-erected at Nottingham Industrial Museum Pinxton Signal box, which once controlled access to Bentinck Colliery has been relocated to Barrow Hill Engine Shed.

Church

The church of St Helen dates from medieval times, possibly having been built on the site of a previous small castle. Much of it was rebuilt in 1790 reusing the original materials, and only the west tower and west end of the old church remains. By 1890, it was so dilapidated that most of the services were held in the mission room. In the following century it was repaired, and a new porch and north aisle were added in 1939.

Broadmeadows
Broadmeadows is a housing estate in the Pinxton parish, built in the 1980s.

See also
Listed buildings in Pinxton

References

External links

"DerbyshireUK" Pinxton

Villages in Derbyshire
Bolsover District
Lime kilns in the United Kingdom